Emilios, or Aimilios, (Greek: Αιμίλιος) is a variant of the given names Emil, Emilio and Emílio, and may refer to:

Aimilios Veakis, Greek actor
Aimilios Papathanasiou, Greek sailor
Emilios T. Harlaftis, Greek astrophysicist
Emilios Hatjoullis, British cartoonist and graphic designer
Emilios Ionas, Greek soccer association president
Emilios Kyrou, Greek-born Australian judge
Emilios Panayiotou, Cypriot footballer
Emilios Riadis, Greek composer

See also
Emilio (disambiguation)